The Adcox Special was a two-seat open-cockpit biplane built by the students of the US Adcox Aviation Trade School in 1929, powered by a Kinner K-5 engine of 100 hp (75 kW).

Although only one example was built, the design formed the basis for the Adcox Student Prince that was produced in small numbers later that year.

See also

References

Special
Biplanes
Single-engined tractor aircraft
1920s United States sport aircraft